Beaconsfield is a suburb on the Island of Montreal, Quebec, Canada, part of the Greater Montreal region locally referred to as the West Island. It is a prestigious residential community located on the north shore of Lac Saint-Louis, bordered on the west by Baie-D'Urfé, north by Kirkland and east by Pointe-Claire.

Incorporated in 1910, named in honour of Benjamin Disraeli, Earl of Beaconsfield, Prime Minister of the United Kingdom and close confidant of Queen Victoria, the city's historical roots go back as far as 1698. Beaconsfield, in its current form, was developed as a cottage community by affluent Montreal residents. Over the decades, the city has transformed from summer homes, to year-round residents, and has flourished.

The population of Beaconsfield, as of the Canada 2021 Census, is 19,277. While the population is predominantly anglophone, 77% of residents speak both official languages of Canada.  Most residents live in single-family homes, though there are residents of townhouses and apartment buildings.

History

In 1678, the Sulpician Order, who owned the Island of Montreal at the time, granted the first concession in this area to Jean Guenet, one of the main merchants of Ville-Marie and tax collector for the island's Seigneurs. Guenet named his concession, located at Pointe Beaurepaire or Thompson Point but now known as Pointe à Quenet, "Beau Repaire". Following the Great Peace of Montreal Treaty in 1701, permanent settlement began that led to farming communities along Lake Saint-Louis.

In 1713, the Parish of St-Joachim de la Pointe Claire was created, which included the present territory of the cities of Beaconsfield, Kirkland and Pointe-Claire.

In 1855, the Grand Trunk Railway was built through the area, and the Canadian Pacific Railway in the 1880s. These brought summer residents from Montreal and the pioneer farming settlement began to transform to a summer cottage resort.

The name Beaconsfield is first attributed to John Henry Menzies who in 1870 bought a country estate then known as "Le Bocage" (originally built by Paul Urgèle Gabriel Valois in 1810). He renamed it in 1877 after Benjamin Disraeli, 1st Earl of Beaconsfield, who was his friend. In time, this name was also used for its train station (which opened in 1879), golf club (opened in 1902), and the Post Office (opened in 1904).

The City (Ville) of Beaconsfield was formed on June 30, 1910, when it split off from the Parish of Saint-Joachim de la Pointe-Claire. In the census of 1911, it had 375 persons, 60 families living in 60 houses. It grew slowly to 990 inhabitants by 1951. During the 1950s and 1960s, Beaconsfield rapidly developed as a residential suburb. By 1966, the last original farm concession began to be developed for residences.

On March 19, 1966, Beaconsfield changed statutes from Ville to Cité ("city"), but on September 18, 1982, this was reverted.

As part of the 2002–2006 municipal reorganization of Montreal Beaconsfield and neighbouring Baie-D'Urfé became the borough of Beaconsfield–Baie-D'Urfé and were merged into the city of Montreal. After a change of government, and the 2004 referendum, both Baie-D'Urfé and Beaconsfield voted to de-merge from Montreal. On January 1, 2006, they were reconstituted as independent municipalities. They still remain part of the urban agglomeration of Montreal.

Demographics 

Religion
Places of worship:
 Beaconsfield United Church, located at 202 Woodside Road
 St. Edmund of Canterbury Church, Roman Catholic parish located at 105 Beaconsfield Boulevard founded 1956
 Beaurepaire United Church, located at 25 Fieldfare Avenue founded 1924
Christ Church Beaurepaire, Anglican parish located at 455 Church Street, founded 1924

Economy
Local businesses:
 Centre commercial Beaconsfield
 Plaza Beaconsfield
 Beaurepaire Village
 Plaza Elm

Local government
Beaconsfield's local government consists of a mayor and six city councillors, each elected to represent one of the city's wards. The current mayor of Beaconsfield is Georges Bourelle, who has held the office since 2013. Following the city's 2021 Municipal Election, the council consists of Bourelle and the following six councillors:

District 1 - Dominique Godin
District 2 - Martin St-Jean
District 3 - Robert Mercuri
District 4 - David Newell
District 5 - Roger Moss
District 6 - Peggy Alexopoulos

List of former mayors

List of former mayors:

 Joseph Léonide Perron (1910–1916)
 George W. Crowdy (1916–1918)
 James S. Brierley (1918–1928)
 James William Shaw (1928–1936)
 Hugh Charles Hillrich (1936–1940)
 Stanislauz Z.-J. Paquin (1940–1942)
 Louis Émile Côté (1942–1948)
 John E. H. Stethem (1948–1950, 1952–1956)
 Llewelyn Paerry (1950–1952)
 R. S. Turnham (1956–1959)
 R. M. Gibb (1959–1960)
 Edwin M. Briggs (1960–1982)
 Patricia M. Rustad (1982–1990)
 Roy Kemp (1990–2003)
 Anne-Marie Parent (2003)
 Ann Myles (2003–2005)
 Bob Benedetti (2005–2009)
 David Pollock (2009–2013)
 Georges Bourelle (2013–present)

Sports and recreation 

Beaconsfield has a number of parks and athletic facilities
 The Recreation Centre, an indoor recreation complex, with a full-sized ice rink, semi-Olympic pool, gymnasium and youth centre. It is home to the Beaconsfield Bluefins, a competitive swim club that has trained athletes from beginner to national competition levels. It is also home to the Lakeshore Panthers, a Quebec minor hockey league, and the Beaconsfield Oldtimers Hockey Association.
 Two private yacht clubs on municipal land: Beaconsfield Yacht Club and Lord Reading Yacht Club.
 A number of neighbourhood parks, playgrounds, and playing fields, including numerous soccer fields, outdoor ice rinks, and baseball fields. Beaconsfield is part of the Lakeshore league, which has sports teams that include hockey, baseball, soccer, football, and tennis.
 The Beaconsfield Rugby Football Club which is a member of the Fédération de Rugby du Québec (FRQ).
 Four community pools that offer swim lessons and public swimming.
 West Island Heritage Bicycle Trail
 Elm Ave Bike Path
Skate park located at the Beaconsfield Recreation Centre

Parks and open spaces

 Angell Woods: dog friendly
 Christmas Park: baseball, tennis, and basketball during the summer and a hockey rink in the winter. 
 Windermere Park: Soccer, baseball, tennis, and basketball during the summer and a skating rink in the winter.
 Centennial Beach: dog friendly
 Saint James Park 
 Drummond
 Beacon Hill Park: baseball, tennis, and swimming during the summer and a hockey rink and sledding hill in the winter. 
 City Lane Park

Local landmarks

 Village Beaurepaire, a commercial development in the heart of Beaconsfield which began in 1925 with the opening of a general store by Sidney Cunningham, the first president of the Beaconsfield Citizen's Association. Home to local bakeries, pubs, and shops.
 The historic cultural centre, Centennial Hall, where exhibitions and concerts take place. 
 La Palette Art Gallery & Art School
 The Beaconsfield Library, with an extensive digital and print collection and excellent reference services. Established in 1951, the library was housed in a broom closet and bookmobile. Only in 1968 did it move to its present location thanks to the financial aid of City Council.
 Heroes Park, honouring those who served.

Transportation

Beaconsfield is served by the Réseau de transport métropolitain (RTM) train system, with two stations, Beaconsfield and Beaurepaire, on the Vaudreuil-Hudson line which ends in downtown Montreal. The city is also served by Société de transport de Montréal (STM) bus lines 200, 201, 211, 217, 221, 354, 361, 382, 401, 405, 411, and 425.

Beaconsfield is also served directly by one major highway, Highway 20 (Autoroute 20) with two exits in Beaconsfield, exit 45 at Avenue Woodland, and exit 48 at Boulevard St-Charles. Access to Beaconsfield is also possible from the Highway 40 (Autoroute 40), exit Boulevard St-Charles - south (Sud).

Education
Education in Beaconsfield, as common in the Montreal area, is operated by school boards divided linguistically. There is separate boards for instruction in English (Anglophone) and French (Francophone).

Francophone
The Centre de services scolaire Marguerite-Bourgeoys operates Francophone public schools, but were previously operated by the Commission scolaire Marguerite-Bourgeoys until June 15, 2020. The change was a result of a law passed by the Quebec government that changed the school board system from denominational to linguistic.

Francophone primary schools: 
 École primaire Beaconsfield
 École primaire Saint-Rémi 
Francophone special purpose school:
 École primaire et secondaire John F. Kennedy

Anglophone
The Lester B. Pearson School Board (LBPSB) operates Anglophone public schools in Beaconsfield.

Anglophone vocational Education:
 Gordon Robertson Centre

Anglophone adult Education:
 Place Cartier Adult Centre

Anglophone secondary schools:
 Beaconsfield High School

Anglophone primary schools:
 Beacon Hill Elementary School
 Christmas Park Elementary School
 St. Edmund Elementary School
 Sherbrooke Academy Junior & Senior Schools
 Clearpoint Elementary School in Pointe-Claire serves some portions

Notable residents

 Madeline-Ann Aksich, philanthropist and Order of Canada recipient
 Alex Killorn, NHL player for the Tampa Bay Lightning and 2020 and 2021 Stanley Cup Champion, born in Halifax, Nova Scotia but raised in Beaconsfield.
 Robert Orr, plays for the Halifax Mooseheads and was drafted by the Carolina Hurricanes in 2021.
 Marc-Édouard Vlasic (born 1987), NHL Player for the San Jose Sharks. Born in Pointe-Claire. Raised in Beaconsfield.

Crime
Spanning the decade between 1995 and 2006 multiple homicides and murder-suicides took place inside homes that were all within  of each other.
 April 1995, Frank Toope, a retired Anglican minister, and his wife Jocelyn were bludgeoned to death during a botched robbery by three youths — aged 13, 14 and 15. All three youths have since reoffended as adults.
 May 2001, Margareth and Ed Fertuck were axed to death by their schizophrenic son, Geoff Fertuck, who committed suicide by jumping in front of a train.
 September 2001, John Bauer shot and killed his wife Helen, their three sons, Jonathan, Wesley and Justin, father-in-law Elmer Carroll and business partner Lucio Beccherini, over a three-day span before taking his own life after setting his house on fire. Their home was located on a street bordering Beaconsfield and Kirkland.
 October 2006, psychologist Dragolub Tzokovitch shot and killed his wife Mila Voynova, and two daughters, Iva and Alice, before taking his own life.

See also
 List of former boroughs of Montreal
 2002–06 municipal reorganization of Montreal
 2000–06 municipal reorganization in Quebec
 Beaconsfield High School (Beaconsfield)

References and notes

External links

 Official site of Beaconsfield
 From collectionscanada.gc.ca Gordon & Gotch's 1924 Map of the Island of Montreal. Beaconsfield is named on this map.

 
Cities and towns in Quebec
Bilingual cities and towns in Quebec
Island of Montreal municipalities